The Australia women's national soccer team results for the period 2000 to 2009 inclusive.

Match results

2000

2001

2002

2003

2004

2005

2006

2007

2008

2009

See also
 Australia women's national soccer team results (1975–99)
 Australia women's national soccer team results (2010–19)
 Australia women's national soccer team results (2020–29)

Notes

External links
 Australian Results

References

2000-09
1999–2000 in Australian women's soccer
2000–01 in Australian women's soccer
2001–02 in Australian women's soccer
2002–03 in Australian women's soccer
2003–04 in Australian women's soccer
2004–05 in Australian women's soccer
2005–06 in Australian women's soccer
2006–07 in Australian women's soccer
2007–08 in Australian women's soccer
2008–09 in Australian women's soccer
2009–10 in Australian women's soccer